Pienso en ti (English: Thinking of You) is a Mexican telenovela produced by W Studios for TelevisaUnivision. It is an original story written by Ximena Suárez. The series stars Dulce María and David Zepeda. It premiered on Las Estrellas on 13 March 2023.

Premise 
Emilia (Dulce María), against her mother's wishes, confronts everyone and everything to pursue her dream of being a successful singer. When Emilia meets Ángel (David Zepeda), her idol, she finds the strength to pursue her dream without imagining that it would be her voice, that would give Ángel back his illusion and his life.

Cast 
 Dulce María as Emilia Rivero
 David Zepeda as Ángel Santiago
 Alexis Ayala as Federico Pérez
 Lore Graniewicz as Alicia Garibay
 Brandon Peniche as Manolo Pérez
 Jessica Díaz as Jeanine Loher
 Yolanda Ventura as Daniela Avendaño
 Henry Zakka as Alfonso Rivero
 María Fernanda García as Laura
 Paola Toyos as Pina López
 Claudia Silva as Carla Torreblanca
 Federico Ayos as Omar Miranda
 Ramiro Tomasini as Max Mendoza
 Ariana Saavedra as Gina Rivero
 José Luis Badalt as Rodolfo "Fofo" Manzo
 Julia Argüelles as Mayte Torreblanca
 Edward Castillo as Joel
 Sebastián Poza as Nicolás Torreblanca
 Eugenia Cauduro as Loreta Ortiz
 José Elías Moreno as Sergio Torreblanca

Production 
In May 2022, the series was announced at TelevisaUnivision's upfront for the 2022–2023 television season, under the working tile Primero tú. On 19 October 2022, Dulce María and David Zepeda were announced in the lead roles. Filming began on 26 October 2022, with Pienso en ti being announced as the official title of the telenovela and an extended cast list being announced the same day.

Ratings 
 
}}

Episodes

Notes

References

External links 
 

2023 telenovelas
2023 Mexican television series debuts
2020s Mexican television series
Televisa telenovelas
Television series produced by W Studios
Mexican telenovelas
Spanish-language telenovelas